The 2016–17 season is PEC Zwolle's 7th season of play in the Eredivisie and also its 7th consecutive season in the top flight of Dutch football for women.

Competitions

Friendlies

Eredivisie

Results summary

Play-offs

KNVB Cup

Statistics

Squad details and appearances

Goalscorers

References

PEC Zwolle seasons
PEC Zwolle Women